The Cymric is a breed of Canadian domestic cat . Some cat registries consider the Cymric simply a semi-long-haired variety of the Manx breed, rather than a separate breed. Except for the length of fur, in all other respects the two varieties are the same, and kittens of either sort may appear in the same litter.  The name comes from Cymru, the indigenous Welsh name of Wales, though the breed is not associated with Wales, and the name was possibly given as an attempt to provide a "Celtic"-sounding name for the breed.  The breed's Manx bloodline originated in the Isle of Man, though Canada claims to have developed the long-haired variant. The breed is called the Longhair Manx or a similar name by some registries.

History
According to Isle of Man records, the taillessness trait of the Manx (and ultimately the Cymric) began as a mutation among the island's domestic cat population. Given the island's closed environment and small gene pool, the dominant gene that decided the cats' taillessness was easily passed from one generation to the next, along with the gene for long hair. Long-haired kittens had been born to Manx cats on the Isle of Man, but had always been discarded by breeders as "mutants". Then, in the 1960s, similar kittens were born in Canada and were intentionally bred. This was the start of the increase of Cymric popularity. It took many years for the Cymric to be recognized as a breed of its own by cat associations. The Manx was recognized in the 1920s, but the Cymric was not shown until the 1960s and did not begin to gain popularity until the mid-1970s.

The Fédération Internationale Féline (FIFe, since 2006), World Cat Federation (WCF), American Association of Cat Enthusiasts (AACE), Canadian Cat Association (CCA-AFC), Australian Cat Federation (ACF), New Zealand Cat Fancy (NZCF), Southern Africa Cat Council (SACC), American Cat Fanciers Association (ACFA, of the US East Coast), and Cat Fanciers' Federation (CFF, in the US Northeast) consider the Cymric a separate breed. The Cat Aficionado Association (CAA) of China does also, by virtue of the CAA having adopted all the breed standards of its Western partner, ACFA; it is unknown if any Cymric breeders are actually in China.

The International Cat Association (TICA) recognizes the Cymric by that name but as a variety of Manx, not a separate breed with its own standard.  Also simply covering it in their Manx breed standards, the US-based Cat Fanciers' Association (CFA), the Co-ordinating Cat Council of Australia (CCCA), and the UK's Governing Council of the Cat Fancy (GCCF) recognize the variety as the long-haired Manx rather than Cymric (the CFA and CCCA call it the Manx Longhair, while GCCF uses the term Semi-longhair Manx Variant).  The ACF formerly took this route, calling it the Longhaired Manx, but recognized it as a separate breed (Cymric) at the beginning of 2015, using the GCCF Manx standard (aside from coat length).

Appearance 

The Cymric is a muscular, compact, medium to large cat with a sturdy bone structure. Males of this Canadian cat breed can get pretty fat and weigh more than 12 pounds. On the other hand, female usually weigh between 8 and 12 pounds. They have a cobby body, and an unusually rounded appearance. Cymrics have large and full eyes and have widely spaced ears. Unlike that of the parent Manx breed, the hair of a Cymric is medium-long, dense and well padded over the main body, adding further to the round appearance. All colours and patterns that are accepted for the Manx are accepted for the Cymric (though exactly which qualify varies by organization).

In the breed of Cymrics, four different tail types are produced. The "rumpy" is the most valued for cat show purposes, and is the only show cat type in some organizations. This is a cat born entirely tailless. Instead, rumpies often have a dimple at the base of the spine where the tail would be. Next, there are "rumpy-risers". These cats have a short knob of tail that is made up of one to three vertebrae connected to the spine. "Stumpies" have a short tail stump, up to about 1/3 of a normal tail length. Finally, "longies" or "fully tailed" have tails as long or almost as long as an ordinary cat's. It is impossible to predict what tail types will appear in any given litter.

There is a big problem with this breed's tail or lack of a tail. Because of how cats are bred, some of them are born with problems in their spines that make it hard for them to walk and get rid of their waste. Most of the time, this problem can be found before a cat is 6 months old.

Isle of Man Longhair (tailed variant) 
The Isle of Man Longhair is essentially a fully tailed Cymric cat, i.e. a cat of Cymric (and thus Manx) stock, with Cymric features, but without expression of the Manx taillessness gene. It is presently only recognized as a separate breed by the New Zealand Cat Fancy (NZCF) with a breed standard. Coat colours are limited to those acceptable in the British Shorthair, and requires the doubled and thick, long coat of the Cymric. In other international registries, such cats are designated "Tailed Cymric" or "Tailed Manx Longhair", only recognized as breeding stock (they are important as such, since breeding two tailless Manx or Cymrics together results in birth defects), and cannot be show cats.

Health

The gene that gives the Cymric and Manx their unusual tails can also be lethal. Kittens who inherit two copies of the tailless gene die before birth and are reabsorbed in the womb. Since these kittens make up about 25 percent of all kittens, litters are usually small. Even cats who inherit only one copy of the gene can have what is called Manx syndrome. This can cause spina bifida, gaps in the vertebrae, fused vertebrae, and bowel or bladder dysfunctions. Also, a rabbit-like hop can sometimes be seen in Cymric cats due to the spinal deformity.

Not every Cymric with a short spine has problems or Manx syndrome. It is simply an attribute of the Manx gene, and its expression cannot be entirely prevented. As the problems usually become apparent within the first six months of age, Cymric and Manx kittens are usually kept by breeders until older before being made available.

Following updated genetic research, both the ACF and (less stringently) the GCCF impose special breeding restrictions on Manx cats (including the Cymric, however named and classified), for animal welfare reasons.

References

External links

Cat breeds
Cat breeds originating in Canada
Cat breeds originating in the Isle of Man
Cat breeds and types with suppressed tails